Acrothamnus maccraei is commonly known as subalpine beard-heath. They are mainly dense like shrubs, with dark green spreading triangle like leaves.

References

Epacridoideae
Ericales of Australia
Plants described in 1855